Waitematā railway station, commonly known as Britomart railway station or Britomart Transport Centre, is the public transport hub in the central business district of Auckland and the northern terminus of the North Island Main Trunk railway line. It combines a railway station in a former Edwardian post office, extended with expansive modernist architectural elements, with a bus interchange. It is at the foot of Queen Street, the main commercial thoroughfare of the CBD, with the main ferry terminal just across Quay Street.

The centre was the result of many design iterations, some of them being substantially larger and including an underground bus terminal and a large underground car park. Political concerns and cost implications meant that those concepts did not proceed. However, at the time of its inception in the early 2000s the centre was still Auckland's largest transport project ever, built to move rail access closer to the city's CBD and help boost Auckland's low usage of public transport. It is one of the few underground railway stations in the world designed for use by diesel trains, although their use is now prohibited. Diesel trains from Hamilton and Wellington terminate at The Strand station, where a connecting bus continues onto Britomart.

Initially seen as underused and too costly, it is now considered a great success, heading for capacity with the growing uptake of rail commuting. Limitations on further patronage are primarily due to the access tunnel from the east which provides only two rail tracks, and the lack of a through connection via a rail link to the North Shore or to the Western line via a tunnel, which would change it into a through station. A tunnel to the Western Line is now under construction, as part of the City Rail Link project. In March 2023, following a joint submission to the New Zealand Geographic Board by Auckland Transport and Auckland Council, the station was officially re-named Waitematā railway station.

History

Earlier uses
Britomart is on reclaimed land in the middle of what was once Commercial Bay. It is named after Point Britomart, a former headland at Commercial Bay's eastern end. In the 1870s and 1880s the headland was levelled and used to fill in Commercial Bay in order to extend the railway line to the bottom of Queen Street.

Auckland Railway Station moved west from its original 1873 site to Britomart in 1885 and remained there after the Post Office was built on the Queen Street frontage in 1911. In 1930 the station was relocated 1.2 km east to Beach Road and the former station site became a bus terminal in 1937 and a car park in 1958.

Many proposals were made to locate the station back in the CBD, most notably in 1973 and 1987, with the 1970s proposal of the Mayor of Auckland, Dove-Myer Robinson, envisaging an underground station at Britomart and a tunnel loop, but that was stopped by the Muldoon National Government, which claimed it was unjustified and too costly. In 1995, Auckland City Council purchased the old Post Office building (PostBank offices closed in 1988, though some postal services remained open beyond that year) and proposed to redevelop the area as a transit centre.

Early designs called for both the bus terminal and the railway to be underground, but these plans were scrapped as consultation showed that buses were preferred above ground by both users and operators, and projected costs soared, partly due to the difficulties with potential water ingress. The developer eventually defaulted on contractual deadlines, and the project failed.

In 1998, a cheaper option was decided on, partly after a consultation process with stakeholders and citizens. The architectural design was chosen via a competition. It used part of Queen Elizabeth II Square and surrounding streets as a bus terminal, with the existing dilapidated bus terminal redeveloped to incorporate both bus services and a pedestrianised area. When nearby Quay Street was realigned in the late 1990s, a tunnel was built (completed in 2000) to provide the underground railway link. Bus services using the old bus terminal were diverted to other locations in June 2001.

Construction

Designed by California architect Mario Madayag in collaboration with local Auckland architects Jasmax, construction of Britomart commenced in October 2001, with structural design having been provided by OPUS. It involved 14 km of piling, some being 40 m long and driven 16 m into the underlying bedrock, mainly to provide good earthquake protection, and to futureproof the area for potential later construction of buildings on top of the station. 200,000 cubic metres were excavated for the station, and 40,000 cubic metres of concrete poured. Approximately  of new rail track was built, of which half was in a cut and cover tunnel. The station has a site area of 5.2 ha and includes 236 m² retail area.

The station opened to passengers on 7 July 2003, with the official opening on 25 July 2003 by Sir Edmund Hillary and government ministers. Services to the Beach Road terminus ceased, except for some peak-time commuter services and excursion trains using the former Platform 4 (originally Platform 7), renamed 'The Strand'. The commuter services ceased after a few months.

Cost over-runs and differing tastes made the centre politically controversial, the design often being described as a large hole in the ground, both literally and figuratively. Despite this and a NZ$204 million price tag, it has won numerous design awards and is internationally recognised for its innovative but heritage-sympathetic architecture. The main source of contention was the relatively great expense of this public transport development in the Auckland Region, where for many decades the focus had been on private vehicle ownership and travel.

Pedestrian underpasses

Initial plans included underground pedestrian walkways to Queen Elizabeth II Square, the nearby downtown ferry terminal and the main shopping street of Queen St. Due to cost over-runs only the short walkway under Queen Street to the square was built, the other two being dropped in favour of a sizeable rain-proof canopy that ran from the square's above-ground exit northward toward the ferry terminal and southward toward the Queen Street-Customs Street intersection.

The underground walkway was closed to pedestrians from 29 March 2016 in order to facilitate preliminary works for the City Rail Link. In April and May 2016, the canopy was dismantled and removed from the site, and on 28 May 2016 the Downtown Shopping Centre was closed and fenced off for demolition.

Further works 
A major commercial building was built over the eastern approach tunnel in the late 2000s, at the eastern edge of the plaza behind the centre.

City Rail Link works 
In January 2017, the Britomart station building was closed and access between it and platforms was blocked off. A new, temporary Britomart station building was opened at the rear of the building, with new stairways and the retention of elevator and escalator access to the platforms. This building was in use for three years. The former building is refurbished and strengthened in preparation for tunnelling under it for City Rail Link services.

To enable the digging of the trench works required for the CRL, the Downtown Shopping Centre was closed on 28 May 2016 and by 23 November had been demolished. It has been replaced with 'Commercial Bay' named after Commercial Bay which was below the modern day site. Commercial Bay consists of the Commercial Bay (PwC tower) skyscraper and the Commercial Bay Shopping Centre. Auckland Council and proprietors Precinct Properties struck a deal to include tunnels for the City Rail Link directly underneath the premises.

On 6 April 2021 at 1pm the surface building (also known as the Central Post Office) was reopened. The opening was attended by Phil Goff and members of the public. The surface building was ceremonially opened by a ribbon cutting.

In June 2022, the number of serviceable platforms was reduced to enable the two outermost platforms (1 and 5) to be connected to the tunnels for the CRL and become through platforms. As a result of this, Onehunga line services were shortened to terminate at Newmarket instead of Britomart. Auckland Transport claimed that removing Onehunga line services from Britomart would be the least disruptive option. However, the Public Transport Users Association criticised the move and alleged that 60% of Onehunga line passengers wanted to travel to Britomart. Former Auckland councillor Mike Lee also criticised the change and claimed that rail staff had told him that the change was unnecessary as only one platform would be closed at a time, which still left four platforms for four lines to be operated out of Britomart. Lee explained that one platform was being used to accommodate a spare AM class EMU (the "hot spare") for service disruptions, however he believed that this spare unit could be held further up the line at The Strand Station which would free up a platform for Onehunga line services to continue to operate out of Britomart.

Capacity and rail connections 

The station is designed to serve up to 10,500 passengers during the peak hour as a terminus. Capacity increases will probably not be possible without turning Britomart into a through station, with a tunnel underneath Auckland CBD (see City Rail Link section below).

The station has five platforms, and is constrained by the 9.3 m width of the 426 m long double-track access tunnel. Early forecasts predicted that while double-tracking of the surrounding rail network would improve peak time train congestion, the capacity of the corridor would not be reached until about 2020. Growth in train patronage and increased services resulted in the tunnel being at maximum capacity from 2011, almost 10 years earlier than predicted. Because of the capacity restrictions, a proposed Hamilton-Auckland commuter train service would have gone to The Strand Station some 1.5 km to the east.

Increased services

In its early days, Britomart was criticised because it was built on a scale and level of grandeur that was well in excess of the capacity and patronage of the rail network. Auckland Regional Council transport committee chairwoman Catherine Harland acknowledged that "Britomart opened ahead of its time", raising public expectations that could not be fulfilled at the time due to the state of the rail network.

Patronage on Auckland's rail network increased from 2.5 million journeys in 2003 to just over 14.2 million in July 2015, and by April 2017 had reached 19 million journeys.

Electrification

It was announced on 17 May 2007 that electrification of Auckland's rail network would proceed. Installation of overhead wires began later, with Auckland Transport (initially ARTA) purchasing new electric units to replace the diesel trains. The project was expected to be completed in 2013.

Britomart was officially electrified on 31 March 2014, with New Zealand's Prime Minister, John Key, flipping the switch in a commemorative ceremony. The first electric passenger services began running four weeks later, between Britomart and Onehunga on the Onehunga Line on 28 April 2014.

From July 2015, all suburban trains serving Britomart were operated by AM Class EMUs, leaving the thrice-weekly Northern Explorer as the only diesel service using the station. By December 2015, the station required a $600,000 upgrade to its diesel extraction fans and Auckland Transport requested that KiwiRail, the operator of the Northern Explorer, fund the upgrade if they wished to continue serving the station. KiwiRail decided that the cost was not justifiable and from 21 December 2015 they ceased serving Britomart and relocated their Auckland terminus to The Strand Station, in the east of the CBD.

City Rail Link

Plans for a tunnel southward underneath the CBD to Mt Eden and even to Morningside were debated for nearly a century. With Britomart in operation since 2003, the tunnel would allow trains to run through the station rather than having to reverse out over the same set of tracks.

On 5 March 2008, ARTA said that it had begun preliminary planning for a 3.5 km tunnel which would most likely be travelling under Albert Street and serving three underground stations: one near Wellesley Street (linking to Aotea Square), one in the Karangahape Road / Pitt Street area, and one near Upper Symonds Street in Newton. At the southern end, the line would link to a redeveloped station at Mt Eden.

Original estimates for the cost of the CRL were at around $1 billion, taking 5–7 years to plan and build. In August 2014 it was announced that the station at Newton had been dropped in favour of an upgraded station at Mt Eden. In 2015, enabling works for CRL construction began. Main works began in 2018.

Following completion of the CRL, some trains will no longer terminate at Britomart. Platforms 5 and 1 will be the through platforms, while platforms 2–4 will remain terminating platforms.

Eastern tunnel capacity

A proposed alternative to the City Rail Link (CRL) to increase capacity was the duplication of the existing eastern Britomart approach tunnel. This would have required a new twin track tunnel approximately 500 metres long to be constructed parallel to the existing twin-track tunnel, resulting in four tracks from Quay Park Junction and retaining Britomart as a terminus. Estimated costs were $150 million to $200 million, with 4–5 years to plan and build. Such a project would have allowed the same capacity increase as the CRL at approximately one sixth to one fifth the cost, but without any of the additional benefits that the two new CRL underground stations or the more direct route to the Western Line will provide.

Initially seen as an inferior, but cheaper and more politically acceptable alternative to the CRL tunnel, the duplicate eastern approach also gained favour as a stop gap implementation due to the comparatively short build time. Even if planning had commenced immediately, the CRL might not have become operational until several years after the maximum capacity of the existing corridor was reached. Moreover, while seen as an alternative to the CRL through connection tunnel, the duplicate eastern tunnel would not have precluded it from being built.

A feature that came into operation in 2011 in time for the 2011 Rugby World Cup and allowed an increase in capacity of the existing tunnel is 'bi-directional signalling', which allows a train to leave on the same track on which it entered – freeing it from having to cross over other tracks which may not be safely clear of other trains. In 2019, funding was agreed to restore a five-year commuter train trial between Papakura and Hamilton, with a one-seat journey to Britomart being the eventual aim.

Services

Trains
Auckland One Rail operates the Auckland suburban rail network on behalf of Auckland Transport. This includes the electrified lines west to Swanson and south to Onehunga, Manukau and Papakura, plus the diesel shuttle service between Papakura and Pukekohe.

In July 2015, it was reported that the number of trains able to enter and leave Britomart was 20 per hour. On a typical weekday inter-peak, nine trains leave Britomart per hour, comprising:
3 trains per hour to Manukau via Glen Innes and Otahuhu (Eastern Line)
3 trains per hour to Papakura via Newmarket and Otahuhu (Southern Line)
3 trains per hour to Swanson via Newmarket, New Lynn and Henderson (Western Line)
Former services

 2 trains per hour to Onehunga (Onehunga Line) via Newmarket and Penrose - until June 2022

Buses and ferries

Britomart is a major interchange between trains, buses and ferries. It is the terminus for many bus routes, including the SkyBus services to and from Auckland Airport and the Northern Express NX1 route along the Northern Busway to and from Albany and the Hibiscus Coast. The frequent CityLink bus service passes nearby on Queen and Customs Streets and the InnerLink bus services stop at Britomart.

Other buses depart from stops on surrounding streets, some of which are up to a block away from the station. Until early 2016, buses arrived at and departed from Queen Street in front of the station building, but that portion of Queen Street is now permanently closed to vehicular traffic and is now a public plaza after an initial temporary closure for CRL tunneling works.

Across Quay Street from the station is the Auckland Ferry Terminal, which is the main hub for Auckland's ferry system. There are ferry services to suburbs including Devonport, Birkenhead and Half Moon Bay, as well as to islands in the Hauraki Gulf such as Waiheke Island and Rangitoto Island.

Heritage registration
The Chief Post Office was registered as a Category I heritage building by Heritage New Zealand on 11 July 1986, with registration number 101.

Awards

Awards that the centre has received:

2004 Property Council of New Zealand – Merit Award, Special Purposes Category
2004 American Institute of Architecture – Architectural Record / Business Week International Winner
2004 New Zealand Institute of Architects – Resene Award, Community and Cultural
2004 New Zealand Institute of Architects – Resene Award, Heritage and Conservation
2004 Illuminating Engineering Society of Australia and New Zealand – Lighting Award
2004 New Zealand Concrete Society – Concrete Award
2005 New Zealand Institute of Architects – Resene New Zealand Award for Architecture, Community & Cultural
2007 Kenneth F. Brown Asia Pacific Culture and Architecture Design Award – Honorable mention

See also
 Public transport in Auckland
 Transport in Auckland
 List of Auckland railway stations

References

External links

Britomart Project (from the Auckland City Council website)
Britomart Transport Centre (BTC official website)
Photographs of Britomart Transport Centre held in Auckland Libraries' heritage collections.

Buildings and structures in Auckland
Rail transport in Auckland
Public transport in Auckland
Railway stations in New Zealand
Heritage New Zealand Category 1 historic places in the Auckland Region
Railway stations located underground
2003 establishments in New Zealand
Railway stations opened in 2003
Auckland CBD